The 1941 Minnesota Golden Gophers football team represented the University of Minnesota in the 1941 Big Ten Conference football season. In their tenth year under head coach Bernie Bierman, the Golden Gophers compiled an undefeated 8–0 record and outscored their opponents by a combined total of 186 to 38. The team's national championship run in the days before the attack on Pearl Harbor was chronicled in journalist Danny Spewak's book, "From the Gridiron to the Battlefield: Minnesota's March to a College Football Title and into World War II," published in 2021 by Rowman & Littlefield. 

The team was selected national champion by eleven NCAA-designated major selectors in Associated Press, Billingsley, Boand, DeVold, Dunkel, Football Research, Helms, Litkenhous, National Championship Foundation, Poling, Sagarin, Sagarin (ELO-Chess).

Halfback Bruce Smith was named an All-American by the Walter Camp Football Foundation, INS, Time-Life, United Press (UP), Associated Press (AP) and Look Magazine. Smith was also awarded the Heisman Trophy, the only Golden Gopher to win the award.

Tackle Dick Wildung was named an All-American by the Walter Camp Football Foundation, INS, Time Life, AP and UPI. Wildung, Smith, halfback Bill Daley, end Bob Fitch and guard Len Levy were named All-Big Ten.

Back Bob Sweiger was awarded the team most valuable player award.

Total attendance for the season was 239,227, which averaged to 47,845. The season high for attendance was against Northwestern.

Schedule

Game summaries

Michigan

On October 25, 1941, Minnesota, ranked #1 in the AP Poll, played Michigan, ranked #3 in the country. Minnesota won the game by a 7 to 0 score on a five-yard touchdown run by halfback Herman Frickey in the second quarter. The touchdown was set up by a 78-yard punt and a 43-yard pass, both by 1941 Heisman Trophy winner Bruce Smith. Minnesota gained 179 rushing yards in the game, while Michigan tallied 135 rushing yards. In the fourth quarter, Michigan twice drove deep into Minnesota territory, but both drives ended with pass interceptions by Minnesota's quarterback Bill Garnaas. The loss was the eighth in a row for the Wolverines against the Golden Gophers. The crowd of 85,753 at Michigan Stadium was the largest to that date to see a football game between two Big Ten Conference teams.

References

Minnesota
Minnesota Golden Gophers football seasons
College football national champions
Big Ten Conference football champion seasons
College football undefeated seasons
Minnesota Golden Gophers football